Madi, or Gira (Girara), is one of the Finisterre languages of Papua New Guinea.

References

Bibliography 
 
  A brief overview of the Gira language is found on p. 50.

Finisterre languages
Languages of Madang Province